LVL IV, pronounced Level Four, is the debut by American post-grunge band Future Leaders of the World. It features the song "Let Me Out" which received extensive airplay and launched Future Leaders of the World into the mainstream. The songs "Kill Pop" and "Make You Believe" were also featured on the game ATV Offroad Fury 3.

Background and style
The development of LVL IV began with frontman Phil Taylor enlisting bassist Toby Cole and drummer Carl Messina. Financed by Puddle of Mudd's Mike Flynn, who Taylor had previously befriended, they arrived in Los Angeles to record a demo which led to Cole's departure by creative differences. By late 2003, bassist Bill Hershey and lead guitarist Jake Stutevoss joined and Taylor negotiated a contract with Epic Records. LVL IV hit shelves the following autumn in 2004.

LVL IV features a heavy post-grunge style easily comparable to Nirvana, a pioneer of grunge, and Puddle of Mudd, a band directly influenced by the former. Taylor's vocals involve strong use of harsh screaming but also fast-paced rapping in tracks such as "Everyday" and "Kill Pop." Lyrically, LVL IV also contains various political themes, drawing further comparison to Rage Against the Machine.

Touring and promotion
LVL IV featured two singles, "Let Me Out" and "Everyday." The former gained higher chart success and had a music video while the latter also performed well on radio.

In promotion of LVL IV, Future Leaders of the World joined SnoCore 2005 with the likes of Chevelle and Crossfade. They also took part in the Jägermeister Music Tour with Submersed and headliners Alter Bridge that spring. It was during this extensive concert schedule that Epic Records informed the band of their contract's termination.

Critical reception

Johnny Loftus gave LVL IV 2.5 out of 5 stars and did not write an extensive review but noted that the album "looked to the sounds of alternative's heyday – Nirvana; Rage Against the Machine – as a guide." He also noted "Spotlight," "Everyday," and "Your Gov't Loves You" as AMG Track Picks.

Track listing 
 "Spotlight" – 4:11
 "Everyday" – 3:22
 "Let Me Out" – 4:04
 "Kill Pop" – 3:47
 "Unite" – 5:12
 "Make You Believe" – 3:26
 "Sued" – 4:05
 "House of Chains" – 4:42
 "4 Sale" – 5:02
 "Your Gov't Loves You" – 4:13

Personnel
 Phil Taylor – vocals, rhythm guitar
 Bill Hershey – bass guitar
 Jake Stutevoss – lead guitar
 Carl Messina – drums
 Mike Flynn – production

Chart positions
LVL IV spent one week on the Billboard 200 at #153 and reached #4 on Top Heatseekers with a total of 20 charting weeks.

Album

Singles

References

External links
 "Let Me Out" music video

2004 debut albums
Epic Records albums
Future Leaders of the World albums